The 1997 Arab Athletics Championships was the tenth edition of the international athletics competition between Arab countries. The tournament occurred in two parts in two different years, with the sexes competing in different locations for the first and so far only time. A total of 42 athletics events were contested, 22 for men and 20 for women.

The scheduled 1997 championships was held from 10 to 12 September in Ta'if, Saudi Arabia and featured only men's events. Regional powers Morocco and Tunisia were absent from this meeting. The men's marathon and racewalking events were dropped from the programme, with the half marathon remaining as the only road event.

A corresponding women's tournament was belatedly staged between 25 and 27 June 1998 in Damascus, Syria. Only five nations participated in the women's events: Tunisia, Egypt, Syria, Lebanon and Palestine

Medal summary

Men

Women

 Only two women finished all events in the heptathlon.

Medal table

Overall

Men

Women

References

Results
 Al Batal Al Arabi(N°:46). Arab Athletics Union. Retrieved on 2015-02-12.

Arab Athletics Championships
Arab Athletics Championships
Arab Athletics Championships
International athletics competitions hosted by Saudi Arabia
Sport in Damascus
Arab Athletics Championships
Arab Athletics Championships
International athletics competitions hosted by Syria
20th century in Damascus